Robert Downie (1894–1968) was a Scottish recipient of the VC for leading a major charge in World War I.

Robert Downie may also refer to:

Robert Downie (footballer) (1867–1893), Scottish footballer, played for Scotland in 1892
Robert Downie (MP) (1771–1841), MP for Stirling Burghs 1820–30
Robert Downie (rower), British double world champion lightweight rower
Robert Roy Downie (1896–1985), politician in Ontario, Canada

See also
Robert Downey (disambiguation)